Big! is a TV series in which an episode consists of a team of engineers manufacturing the world's biggest items (usually a household item that's normally hand carried, scaled up to proportions that make the items unusable without JCBs and Cherrypickers) for the sake of setting world records.

The devices have to function to qualify.

The series originally aired on Discovery Channel in 2004. It is currently airing on The Science Channel weekday mornings.

Cast
 Frank Payne
 Eric Scarlett
 Reverend Gadget
 Lisa Legohn
 Wink Eller
 Christoff Koon

Episodes
 101: Blender
 102: Popcorn
 103: Electric Guitar
 104: Motorcycle (01) - To be continued...
 105: Motorcycle (02)
 106: Giant Claw (game)
 107: BBQ
 108: Clippers
 109: Wood Cuckoo Clock - The team did not achieve an official Guinness World Records.  Stuart Claxton, the Guinness World Records representative said that it didn't qualify because the team used styrofoam to create portions of the clock; a material which would not be found in a "genuine" Cuckoo Clock.
 110: Toaster - The team did not achieve an official Guinness World Records. The team had to disable one side of the toaster to stop breaking the switch on the generator, the bread was only toasted near the center, and the toaster didn't properly "pop" the toast up.
 111: Espresso Machine
 112: Treadmill - Stuart Claxton, of Guinness World Records, certified the team's creation as the World's Largest Treadmill.
 113: Vacuum Cleaner - Stuart Claxton of Guinness World Records certified the team's creation as the World's Largest Vacuum Cleaner.

External links
 
 Original Productions site

2000s American reality television series
2004 American television series debuts
2004 American television series endings
Discovery Channel original programming
Television series by Original Productions